Kayaönü is a village in the Palu District of Elazığ Province in Turkey. Its population is 175 (2021).

References

Villages in Palu District